Franz Jozeph Island (or Franz Josef, Franc Jozeph, etc.) is an island located at the mouth of the Buna River in Albania. The island is made up of rich alluvial soil and becomes a peninsula depending on the size of the river's flow. This island is an important nesting ground for many seabirds, especially the family Ardeidae.

The island is low ground covered with a sandy seashore and dominated by alder trees. The island receives few foreign tourists and attracts for its quietness.

The name was given to the island by Austrian cartographers in 1870. It is believed that the name was chosen in honor of the Emperor Franz Joseph I of Austria.

Franz Joseph Island disappeared since 2011.

References

Islands of Albania
Islands of the Adriatic Sea
Uninhabited islands of Albania
Geography of Shkodër County
Franz Joseph I of Austria
Former islands